Thisted station ( or Thisted Banegård) is a railway station serving the town of Thisted in Thy, Denmark.

The station is the northern terminus of the Thy Line from Struer to Thisted. The station opened in 1882 with the opening of the Thy Line. The train services are currently operated by Arriva which run frequent local train services between Thisted and Struer, and  DSB which offers direct InterCity services to Copenhagen.

History 

The station opened on 20 April 1882 to serve as the northern terminus of the new railway line from Struer to Thisted. In 1904, Thisted station also became the western terminus of the new Thisted-Fjerritslev railway line, which connected with the Fjerritslev-Frederikshavn railway line in Fjerritslev. The Thisted-Fjerritslev Line closed in 1969. In 2003, operation of the local rail services between Thisted and Struer were transferred from DSB to the public transport company Arriva.

Architecture 
The station building from 1881 was designed by the Danish architect N.P.C. Holsøe who was head architect of the Danish State Railways.

Operations 
The train services are currently operated by Arriva which run frequent local train services from Thisted station to Struer station with onward connections to the rest of Denmark. DSB runs a twice daily InterCity service to Copenhagen.

References

Citations

Bibliography

External links

 Banedanmark – government agency responsible for maintenance and traffic control of most of the Danish railway network
 DSB – largest Danish train operating company
 Arriva – British multinational public transport company operating bus and train services in Denmark
 Danske Jernbaner – website with information on railway history in Denmark

Thisted
Railway stations opened in 1882
Railway stations in the North Jutland Region
Buildings and structures in Thisted
1882 establishments in Denmark
Railway stations in Denmark opened in the 19th century